A hamster cage is an enclosure designed to house one or more hamsters. It is recommended that hamster cages contain at least 1,524 cm2 (600 in2) of floor space, although there is some evidence that hamsters experience less stress if housed in larger cages. Commercially available pens are made of wire or plastic. Some pet owners house their hamsters in aquarium tanks, and some make their own pens out of wood. Laboratory hamsters, commonly known as Laboratory Syrian hamsters, are housed in pens designed for scientific use. There are also special pens designed for hamster shows.

Cage specifications

Cage size 
A minimum of 24 inches by 12 inches, and at least 12 inches tall.

Flooring and bedding 
The ideal floor for a hamster is solid and covered with bedding. Hamsters whose cages have thick bedding experience greater health. Wire flooring can harm hamster paws, causing bumblefoot, so floors are typically covered with solid materials such as cardboard, ceramic, or specially designated mats. Wire cages that permit hamsters to throw bedding material through the wires as they burrow, dig, and play are commonplace. Alternatively, pens with solid walls that contain all the bedding and prevent drafts of air from disturbing the hamster may also be used. Larger hamsters, such as Syrian hamsters, need larger pens and more floor space than smaller hamsters.

Wire-top cages
A wire-top cage is a plastic base with an overarching wire structure. Wire-top cages come in varying shapes and sizes, and may contain one or more levels with tubes, stairs, and ladders connecting the levels. A wire-top cage with wired stairs may cause bumblefoot. Pens with smaller gaps are usually intended for mice, and are likely to be too small to provide adequate space for any species of hamster.

It is recommended to choose a wire cage that has at least 450 square inches (2,900 square centimeters) of unbroken floor space and a plastic base with a height of at least 5.9 inches (15 centimeters). Most colorful wire-top cages that are sold in pet shops do not meet these requirements and can cause stress for hamsters. Wire cages with more height than width or length are not recommended, as hamsters are burrowing animals and thus need more floor space.

Well-designed wire-top cages are designed with doors that are specifically placed to allow humans to open them as needed, accessing any part of the pen. Wire-top cages that are built with a cantilever design for the upper levels, may wobble if not designed properly. The wobbling may upset hamsters, who prefer stable ground. Ideally, wire-top cages should have a securely fastened plastic base attached to the wire frame so that the entire pen can be transported without risk of separating or compromising the cage structure.

Plastic tank cages

Plastic tank cages range from simple boxes to elaborately designed structures with tubes, tunnels, and separate rooms to encourage exploration. Many plastic tank cages are designed to be expanded with additional modules that connect to the main pen with clamps or tunnels. These modules are generally sold separately.

Due to the design of plastic cages, hamsters may be able to gnaw on parts of the interior. Pens are not designed to be chewed,  however, if a cage is large enough, and if a hamster has other things to gnaw, then most hamsters will not chew on the cage. Syrian hamsters are more likely to chew small tubes and cages that are designed for smaller hamsters.

Most plastic cages are too small for hamsters, causing them to become bored and display unwanted behaviors, such as obsessive bar-chewing, repetitive climbing, aggression, or attempting escape. Smaller modules may have poor ventilation, increasing the risk of respiratory disease for the hamster.

Aquariums

Aquariums can be modified to serve as hamster cages. Hamsters cannot chew glass aquariums because the walls are smooth and there are no projections. Glass aquariums can be heavy and difficult to move, however, and it may be challenging to find an appropriate top to contain the hamster, especially if toys are put in the aquarium that could allow the hamster to escape over the sides. An aquarium must provide at least  of floor space. Thus, a 40-gallon aquarium is the minimum recommended size for a hamster, but larger sizes are always encouraged.

Wooden cages

Wooden cages for hamsters are not mass-marketed, but they are an option for hamster owners who are handy and wish to construct their own, or for breeders or rescuers who need to custom-make a large number of pens for multiple hamsters. Wooden cages must be made of untreated hardwood that a hamster can gnaw and eat, because over time they will chew the pen. Since the hamster may chew and ingest the cage material, using wood glue to hold the cage together is inappropriate, as it is poisonous to hamsters. In addition, wood tends to collect urine stains and scents, making it difficult to clean.

Accessories
Hamsters enjoy toys for behavioral enrichment. Hamster toys should be non-toxic and sanitized. Hamsters also enjoy going inside objects and climbing things. Some plastic toys and accessories can absorb heat, which is unsafe for dwarf hamsters in hot weather.

Hamster wheel

Hamster wheels are exercise devices that allow hamsters to run, even in a confined space. Wheels intended for smaller breeds may not be appropriate for Syrian hamsters, but this information is not always divulged to consumers. The Veterinary Association for Animal Welfare (TVT) recommends that wheels be at least  for Dwarf hamsters and at least  for Syrian hamsters, since wheels with smaller diameters can lead to permanent spinal curvature, especially in young animals. The Veterinary Association also recommends providing hamsters with a solid running surface, as rungs or mesh can catch limbs and cause injury.

Hamster house
Since hamsters are nocturnal in captivity, dark sleeping quarters during daylight hours are vital. Hamster houses, or hide boxes, provides this. Wooden houses or hideouts made of natural materials can help to keep hamsters cool in the summer.

Hamster houses should be well-ventilated, to avoid condensation and dampness. Hide boxed improve the hamster's mental well-being, and the absence of a hide box can make them feel vulnerable and unsafe. Most hamsters will choose to nest and hoard food in their hideout, although some will use corners of the cage or even their wheel.

Hamster toilet
Hamsters are naturally clean animals and prefer to urinate in a designated corner of their cage. If their cage includes a suitable enclosed room, then the hamster is likely to use that room as a toilet area. Hamster keepers may suggest a toilet area to a hamster by putting soiled hamster bedding into the specific area. A large jar may be used as a toilet, but it must be removed and cleaned regularly .

Sand bath
All hamsters need a sand bath to groom themselves. The sand keeps their fur clean, and digging in sand helps to maintain their claws. Sand for a sand bath should be fine, but not dusty. Reptile sand can be used as long as it does not contain calcium or any other additive. Other examples are play sand or chinchilla bath sand. Some hamsters will also use their sand bath as a litter box.

Other toys
Like all other rodents, a hamster's teeth grow throughout its lifetime. As such, they need chew toys for proper dental care. Salt licks and mineral chews contain dangerous chemicals that are toxic for hamsters. Hamster owners must provide hardwood chews to prevent the hamster's teeth from growing too long, causing pain, disfigurement, and possible death.

Unsafe hamster supplies

Hamster balls

Hamster balls are small, hollow spheres intended to allow hamsters to safely exercise outside of their cage. They are generally made of transparent plastic, contain air holes, and have a removable lid. TVT warns that hamster balls can be hazardous, as hamsters can not free themselves from the ball, and they cannot control its speed or direction. While in a hamster ball, especially a transparent one, hamsters cannot meet their natural instinct to take cover. Hamster balls may bang into walls or fall from raised surfaces, causing injury to the hamster. The small ventilation slots may not provide sufficient air supply for the hamster. TVT considers hamster balls to be dangerous, and they do not recommend them for any small mammal.

Plastic tubes
Plastic tubes can pose a large risk to a hamster's safety, especially when arranged into longer tunnel systems. The plastic tubes do not have sufficient ventilation, and if set at a steep angle, they can cause the hamster to fall and injure themselves. Many commercial tubes are also too small for larger hamster breeds, and they may become stuck in the tubes. Well ventilated, short tubes that allow the hamster to comfortably turn around, can be used safely.

Scented bedding
Beddings with added scents are not safe for hamsters. Scented bedding disrupts the animal's own scent markings, causing stress. The scent can also harm their sensitive respiratory system.

Harnesses and leashes
Since hamsters are very small and fragile, harnesses and leashes can easily cause them injury. They also prevent hamsters from following their natural flight behavior, which can cause considerable stress.

Cotton fluff
Cotton fluff is a synthetic nesting material. It may be sold under other names, such as hamster fluff, cotton fluff, soft and safe bedding, fluff bedding etc. Cotton fluff has long fibers that are tear resistant, and they can easily get stuck in hamster's cheek pouches, or wrap around their limbs, cutting off circulation. As a safe alternative to cotton fluff, some owners provide their hamsters with toilet paper for nesting purposes.

Cedar and pine bedding
Cedar and pine wood contains harmful oils that have been known to cause respiratory infections in small animals. Therefore, bedding made from cedar or pine is considered unsafe for hamsters.

Housing multiple hamsters 
Since hamsters are solitary animals, they can exhibit aggressive behavior when housed with other hamsters. If hamsters who live together are not compatible, they can seriously injure or kill one another. Therefore, it is recommended for most species of hamsters to live in independent cages. The Syrian hamster and Chinese hamster are particularly known for their unsocial behaviors, and is it recommended that they be live on their own. Dwarf hamsters have a higher chance of safely living in groups under the right conditions.

Some hamsters can be housed together if certain precautions are taken. Because hamsters use odors to communicate, it may be easier for hamsters to live harmoniously if they are introduced to each other at birth.  Increasing the number of feeding areas for hamsters can prevent them from becoming territorial and fighting over food.  Keeping only same gendered hamsters together can also prevent aggression. Even when these precautions are taken, it is important to monitor hamster behavior in group settings so that they can be separated if necessary.

Escape
Hamsters will exploit any opportunity to escape from their cage. Most commonly, they escape when a cage door has not been closed properly. They have the ability to flatten their bodies, squeezing through very small holes and gaps. Hamsters may sometimes open latches or unscrew connections to open the cage themselves. Hamsters may also create escape holes by gnawing on the cage. If the hamster has access to both the inside of its cage and the outside world, it may collect some of its bedding and hoarded food to establish a new den. A bucket mousetrap is the most common way to catch a hamster. This trap places food, such as leafy greens, in a bucket that has a staircase leading up to it. The hungry hamster will climb the stairs, fall into the bucket, and be captured.

Society and culture
The National Hamster Council in the United Kingdom maintains recommendations for hamster cages for pet owners and breeders. United States regulations which apply to hamsters are in the Animal Welfare Act of 1966 and described further in the Institute for Laboratory Animal Research's Guide for the care and Use of Laboratory Animals including legal regulations for hamster cages in the United States.

See also
Syrian hamster care

References

Additional reading

External links

How to Set Up a Hamster Cage by wikiHow
GOOD and BAD Hamster Cages, a video review by YouTuber ChocolateColors26
Comfortable Quarters for Hamsters in Research Institutions

Hamster equipment
Buildings and structures used to confine animals